Swithhelm was King of Essex from 660 to 664.

Swithhelm succeeded King Sigeberht II after he, along with his brother Swithfrith, murdered him.  They accused him of being too friendly toward Christians.  In 662, however, he was persuaded to convert to Christianity by Aethelwald, king of East Anglia.  After his death in 664, he was succeeded by his cousins Sighere and Sebbi.

External links
 

664 deaths
Converts to Christianity from pagan religions
East Saxon monarchs
7th-century English monarchs
Year of birth unknown